is a private university in Kawaguchi, Saitama, Japan, established in 2001. The predecessor of the school was founded in 1972.

External links
 Official website 

Educational institutions established in 1972
Private universities and colleges in Japan
Universities and colleges in Saitama Prefecture
Buildings and structures in Kawaguchi, Saitama